Campyloneurus elegans is a species of wasp in the subfamily Braconinae. It is found in Cameroon.

References

External links 

 
 Campyloneurus elegans at insectoid.info
 Campyloneurus elegans at waspweb.org

Endemic fauna of Cameroon
Braconinae
Hymenoptera of Africa
Insects of Cameroon
Insects described in 1914